Acrocephalus may refer to:
 Acrocephalus (bird), a bird genus in the family Acrocephalidae
 Acrocephalus (plant), a plant genus in the family Lamiaceae